Tarja is a Finnish feminine given name. It is a variant of the name Daria, which means "who holds firm the good". It may refer to:

Notable people

Tarja Turunen, a Finnish singer
Tarja Cronberg, a Finnish politician
Tarja Filatov, a Finnish politician
Tarja Halonen, a Finnish politician and President of Finland (2000–2012)
 Tarja Owens, Irish Biker

Fictional characters
 Tharja, a dark mage from Fire Emblem Awakening

References

Finnish feminine given names